Charles E. Nelson (born July 11, 1882, in Sweden) was elected to the Wisconsin State Assembly in 1948. He was a Republican. He graduated from University of Wisconsin. Nelson served on the Superior, Wisconsin common council, the Douglas County, Wisconsin Board of Supervisors, and clerk of the Douglas County, Wisconsin Circuit Court. Nelson died on February 7, 1966, in Superior, Wisconsin.

References

Swedish emigrants to the United States
Republican Party members of the Wisconsin State Assembly
Politicians from Superior, Wisconsin
University of Wisconsin–Madison alumni
Wisconsin city council members
County supervisors in Wisconsin
1882 births
1966 deaths
20th-century American politicians